Belogorsk or Bilohirsk is the name of several inhabited localities in Russia and Ukraine.

Urban localities
Belogorsk, Amur Oblast, a town in Amur Oblast; administratively incorporated as an urban okrug
Bilohirsk (Crimea), recognized by many countries as part of Ukraine
Belogorsk, Kemerovo Oblast, an urban-type settlement in Tisulsky District of Kemerovo Oblast

Rural localities
Belogorsk, Irkutsk Oblast, a settlement in Usolsky District of Irkutsk Oblast